was the pseudonym of Japanese Shōwa period painter and Waka poet, Omata Shinjirō.

Career
Kanpū (1894 – 22 October 1947) was born in Wakayama, Wakayama Prefecture, where he later grew up and studied western style oil painting. In 1913, he went to Tokyo to studied at the Taiheiyōgakai Kenkyūjo and the Japan Fine Arts Academy (Nihon Bijutsu-in). After the death of his father in 1918, Kanpū moved to Meguro City (Tokyo) to live with his younger sister.

In the early Shōwa period, he converted to Japanese-style painting, and studied under Terasaki Kogyo. After Terasaki died he studied  under . He joined the waka poetry coterie "Aogaki" in 1927, and drew cover illustrations for their coterie magazine for years. His first exhibition  (The picture scroll recording a journey in Wakayama) was held at Shirakiya department store, Tokyo in 1934.  The picture scroll is possessed by Museum of Modern Art, Wakayama. His second exhibition,  was held in 1936 and his third exhibition,  was held in 1938. Shown in 1940, his fourth exhibition, entitled , featured depictions of the Waka poetry from Man'yōshū, the oldest existing collection of Japanese poetry, and is considered his most important set of work.

Works

References
 Kanpū Ōmata "Manyo-shu ga sen", Nara Shimbunsha, Nara, 2000, 
 "Retrospective Ōmata Kanpū 1894–1947; Special Exhibition Commemorating the Third Anniversary of Nara Prefecture Complex of Manyo Culture", Nara Prefecture Complex of Manyo Culture, Nara, 2004

External links
Museum of Modern Art, Wakayama 
Nara prefecture Complex of Manyo Culture 
Kappo Tochu  
"Manyo-shu ga sen" from Cultural Heritage Online 
"Ryōkan Temari uta(Ryōkan's poem) " from Cultural Heritage Online 
"Tao Yuanming " from Cultural Heritage Online 

1894 births
1947 deaths
20th-century Japanese painters